Fuqaha or El-Foqaha is a spring-fed town in central Libya, 200 km by road south of Sokna, on the western edge of the great central Haruj volcano and lava field. It is an isolated Berber-speaking locale, and it shares this identity with the oasis of Sokna to its north. 

Fuqaha was one of the last holdouts of loyalists in the 2011 Libyan civil war. 

Populated places in Jufra District